Ryan Gariepy (born October 25, 1986) is a Canadian engineer, roboticist, and technology entrepreneur. He co-founded Clearpath Robotics with Matt Rendall, Bryan Webb, and Patrick Martinson in 2009, and subsidiary OTTO Motors in 2015. Gariepy currently serves as the Chief Technology Officer of both Clearpath Robotics and OTTO Motors, and as a founding board member of Open Robotics. He is named on over 40 patents and patents pending in the field of intelligent systems.

Early life 
Ryan Gariepy was born in Barrie, Ontario, on October 25, 1986. He was valedictorian of the St. Peter's Catholic Secondary School class of 2004, where he received seven awards. He later entered the University of Waterloo, where he obtained a Bachelor of Applied Science degree in Mechatronics Engineering in 2009, and a Master of Science degree in Mechanical Engineering in 2012.

He was an intern at Kiva Systems in 2007 (now Amazon Robotics).

Career 
Gariepy co-founded Clearpath Robotics, also in Waterloo, Ontario, Canada. In 2012, Gariepy became a founding member of the board of directors of Open Robotics. He also serves as a co-organizer for the ROS Developer Conference, dating back to 2012.

Gariepy is a founding member of the Board of Directors of Next Generation Manufacturing Canada, a founding member of the Board of Directors of the NSERC Canadian Robotics Network, and an IEEE Robotics and Automation Society keynote speaker. He is the sole Singularity University Canada Robotics Faculty Member, and is also an associate with Creative Destruction Lab's Space program.

In 2015, Gariepy was recognized by the University of Waterloo with the Faculty of Engineering Alumni Achievement Medal alongside the other Clearpath Robotics co-founders.

Gariepy is often credited as the first roboticist and first entrepreneur to openly pledge not to make 'killer robot' (Lethal autonomous weapon) systems.

References 

1986 births
Canadian roboticists
Living people
People from Barrie